Birchcliffe Baptist Church is a redundant Baptist chapel in the town of Hebden Bridge, West Yorkshire, England. It was founded by Daniel Taylor in 1764.

In 1807 a splinter group left to found Mount Zion Baptist Church, Slack, Heptonstall as they were unhappy with the ordination of a new minister, Henry Hollinrake.

Three churches called Birchcliffe have existed on the site: the second was built in 1825, and demolished in 1933; the third and current building was built further down the hill and opened on 31 October 1899. It closed for worship in the 1970s.

Today the building is Grade II listed and is known as the Birchcliffe Centre. Little remains of the original chapel buildings, aside from part of the school building and the graveyard.

See also

Wainsgate Baptist Church

References

External links
History of Birchcliffe Baptist
Records deposited with the National Archives
Records deposited with the West Yorkshire Archive Services
Birchcliffe Centre

Grade II listed churches in West Yorkshire
18th-century Baptist churches in the United Kingdom
Churches completed in 1890
19th-century Baptist churches
Redundant churches
Former Baptist churches in England
Hebden Bridge
19th-century churches in the United Kingdom